Laevicaspia is a genus of gastropods belonging to the family Hydrobiidae.

The species of this genus are found in near Black Sea and Caspian Sea.

Species:

Laevicaspia abichi 
Laevicaspia caspia 
Laevicaspia cincta 
Laevicaspia conus 
Laevicaspia derzhavini 
Laevicaspia ebersini 
Laevicaspia ismailensis 
Laevicaspia kolesnikoviana 
Laevicaspia kowalewskii 
Laevicaspia lencoranica 
Laevicaspia lincta 
Laevicaspia malandzii 
Laevicaspia marginata 
Laevicaspia obventicia 
Laevicaspia pseudoazovica 
Laevicaspia raffii 
Laevicaspia seninskii 
Laevicaspia sieversii 
Laevicaspia sobrievskii 
Laevicaspia subeichwaldi 
Laevicaspia vinarskii

References

Hydrobiidae